The Ballad of G.I. Joe is a musical comedy parody short film released in 2009 on the website Funny or Die. Written by Daniel Strange and Kevin Umbricht, it spoofs several characters from G.I. Joe: A Real American Hero by showing what they do in their spare time.

Plot
The song The Ballad of G.I. Joe is sung as the video looks into the lives of various Joe characters when they are off duty, showing that their private lives are quite different from their 'Joe' personas.

Cast
 Laz Alonso as Doc
 Alexis Bledel as Lady Jaye
 Billy Crudup as Zartan
 Zach Galifianakis as Snow Job
 Tony Hale as Dr. Mindbender
 Vinnie Jones as Destro
 Joey Kern as Tomax and Xamot
 Chuck Liddell as Gung-Ho
 Julianne Moore as Scarlett
 Robert Remus as Sgt. Slaughter
 Henry Rollins as Duke
 Alan Tudyk as Shipwreck
 Olivia Wilde as Baroness
 Jamin Fite as Cobra Commander
 Frankie Kang as Storm Shadow
 Geoff Mann as Buzzer
 Andreas Owald as Snake Eyes
 Daniel Strange as Torch
 Kevin Umbricht as Ripper

Reception
Web Worker Daily wrote that for Funny Or Die, "knowing a ton of celebrities is half the battle for attracting eyeballs to its viral videos." While offering that the song The Ballad of G.I. Joe is "just okay", the film itself was enjoyable for seeing "celebs dressed like Joe characters." G4TV called the short "a creative accomplishment" which "contains a plethora of cameos that need to be seen to be believed", and wrote that "The Ballad of G.I. Joe is nothing less than total win." I09 noted that the G.I. Joe movie led to numerous viral videos, and offered that The Ballad of G.I. Joe was the best.

References

External links
 
  at Funny or Die

G.I. Joe
American short films
2009 films
Funny or Die
2000s English-language films